Ultraviolet is the fifth studio album by metalcore band Misery Signals and was released on August 7, 2020. The album marks the first from the band since 2013's Absent Light, as well as their first album with Stu Ross on guitar since 2008's Controller and Jesse Zaraska on vocals since 2004's Of Malice and the Magnum Heart, after vocalist Karl Schubach parted ways with the group.

The album was produced by the band's former rhythm guitarist, Greg Thomas, along with being engineered by Tim Creviston, Devin Townsend and Matt Byles.

Track listing

Personnel 
Misery Signals
Jesse Zaraska – vocals
Ryan Morgan – guitar
Stu Ross – guitar
Kyle Johnson – bass
Branden Morgan – drums

References 

2020 albums
Misery Signals albums
Albums produced by Devin Townsend